The following lists events that happened during 2002 in Jordan.

Incumbents
 Monarch - Abdullah II

Events
 2002–03 Jordan League

April 
 April 26-28 - 2002 Asian Taekwondo Championships

July 
 July 10-15 -  2002 Asian Women's Junior Handball Championship

September 
 Jordan at the 2002 Asian Games

See also

 Years in Iraq
 Years in Syria
 Years in Saudi Arabia

References

 
2000s in Jordan
Jordan
Jordan
Years of the 21st century in Jordan